Aemilia, Licinia and Marcia were Roman vestal Virgins, who were prosecuted for having broken the vow of chastity in two famous trials between 115 and 113 BC. The first trial was conducted by the Pontifex Maximus Metellus Delmaticus, who sentenced to death Aemilia in 114 BC. The decision to spare the other two vestals triggered outrage and led to a follow-up trial headed by Cassius Longinus Ravilla. Licinia and Marcia were subsequently put to death as well. The trials were heavily influenced by the political background and network of the participants.

The individuals 
Aemilia was a member of the patrician gens Aemilia.  Licinia was a member of the plebeian gens Licinia and the daughter of Gaius Licinius Crassus.  In 123, her dedication of an altar was cancelled by the pontiffs because it had been made without the approval of the people.  Marcia was a member of the plebeian gens Marcia and possibly the daughter of Quintus Marcius Rex, praetor in 144 BC.

The trials 
In 115 BC, the vestals Aemilia, Marcia and Licinia were tried for incestum. Reportedly, Aemilia had initially been seduced by Lucius Veturius.  After this, she arranged for Marcia and Licinia to have sexual relations with Lucius Veturius' male friends.  Aemilia and Licinia had multiple lovers, while Marcia had a monogamous relationship. The three vestals were prosecuted after being reported to the authorities by their slave Manius, who had helped in exchange for manumission he never received.  According to Manius, the affairs of the vestals was widely tolerated within the Roman aristocracy. 
The trial was a great scandal in contemporary Rome. Aemilia was found guilty and sentenced to death by the Pontifex Maximus Lucius Caecilius Metellus Dalmaticus. Licinia and Marcia were both acquitted. 

The acquittal of Marcia and Licinia created public outrage in Rome because of Manius' testimony that the sexual crimes of the vestals had been an open secret and tolerated among the aristocracy, and the public interpreted the outcome as a case of corruption among the elite.  The case against Licinia and Marcia was therefore reopened the following year by the tribune Sextus Peducaeus, who took the unusual step to transfer the case from the pontiff to Lucius Cassius Longinus Ravilla, who was known for his severity.  They (or at least Licinia) were defended by the orator Lucius Licinius Crassus. 

The second trial ended in a guilty verdict for both Licinia and Marcia who were both judged guilty as charged to be executed by live burial.  During the trial, several men were implicated as the alleged lovers of the vestals and prosecuted.  This involved several prominent people and the process has by some been interpreted as political. Among those men implicated were the orator Marcus Antonius, who was however acquitted.  Four men were judged guilty as charged for having been the lovers of the vestals, and sentenced to be buried alive at the forum boarium. 

After the trial, several rituals were conducted to clean the holy fire of Vesta from the pollution which was believed to have soiled it because of the crimes.

References

Bibliography 

 T. Robert S. Broughton, The Magistrates of the Roman Republic, American Philological Association, 1952–1986.
 Michael Crawford, Roman Republican Coinage, Cambridge University Press, 1974.

114 BC deaths
Vestal Virgins
2nd-century BC Roman women
Executed ancient Roman women